Matoba-cho is a Hiroden station (tram stop) on Hiroden Main Line and Hiroden Hijiyama Line, located in Matoba-cho, Minami-ku, Hiroshima.

Routes
From Matoba-cho Station, there are four of Hiroden Streetcar routes.

  Hiroshima Station - Hiroshima Port Route
  Hiroshima Station - Hiroden-miyajima-guchi Route
 Hiroshima Station - (via Hijiyama-shita) - Hiroshima Port Route
 Hiroshima Station - Eba Route

Connections
█ Main Line
  
Enkobashi-cho — Matoba-cho — Inari-machi
█ Hijiyama Line

Enkobashi-cho — Matoba-cho — Danbara 1-chome

History 
Opened Main Line on November 23, 1912.
Opened Hijiyama Line on December 27, 1944.

See also

Hiroden Streetcar Lines and Routes

References

Hiroden Hijiyama Line stations
Hiroden Main Line stations
Railway stations in Japan opened in 1912